Said and Done is the debut album by Irish boy band Boyzone. The album was released on 21 August 1995 by Polydor Records and went straight to No. 1 on the UK Albums Chart. The album sold 1.2 million copies in the first year of its release. As of December 1997, the album had sold 2.2 million copies worldwide.

Overview
Said and Done was released officially in Ireland and the UK on 21 August 1995 by Polydor Records. The album topped the UK Albums Chart right upon its release and went on to spend 58 weeks in Top 75. It was certified as 3× Platinum in the UK.

Five official singles were released from the album, all of which were Top 5 hits in the UK: "Love Me for a Reason", "Key to My Life", "So Good", "Father and Son" and "Coming Home Now". "Believe in Me" was also issued as a single, exclusively in Japan. It was released as an alternative to "Father and Son" in the country.

The first Irish pressing of the album, of which only around 10,000 copies exist, contains the group's debut single, "Working My Way Back to You", in place of "Father and Son", which was featured as a B-side to "Love Me for a Reason" instead. This version was available on 4 August 1995, as an exclusive to the Irish retail chain Foley's. All later pressings contain the final track listing.

Some Japanese Editions of the album came encased in a special slipcase, containing a bonus photo booklet.

Track listing

Charts

Weekly charts

Year-end charts

Certifications and sales

References

1995 debut albums
Boyzone albums